Simcock may refer to:

Bob Simcock (born 1947), the Mayor of Hamilton, New Zealand
Gwilym Simcock (born 1981), British pianist and composer
Simcock House (Swansea, Massachusetts), historic house at 1074 Sharps Lot Road in Swansea, Massachusetts